Hans Georg Wilhelm Bechly (1871–1954) was a German labor leader and trade unionist.

Early life 

Hans Georg Wilhelm Bechly was born on November 20, 1871 to Adolph and Anna (Gragow) Bechly in Neubrandenburg, Mecklenburg-Strelitz, Germany. He married Clara Graf in 1909, and they had two children.

Hans trained as an apprentice from 1889 to 1893 in Rostock, Germany, and he served the military with the Queen Elisabeth Grenadier Guards Regiment in Charlottenburg 1893–1894.

Career 

Bechly worked for several years in clerical positions, and became employed with the German National Retail Clerks Association (DHV) in July 1900. He rose within the association and became interim president of the DHV in 1909.

Bechly was Chairman of the German National Retail Clerks Association (DHV) from 1911 to 1933, and also Chairman of the General Association of German Professional Employees (Gedag) from 1923 to 1933.

On May 2, 1933, Adolf Hitler used his powers as the new Chancellor of Germany to dissolve all trade unions and issue arrest warrants for unionist leadership. Bechly went into seclusion to avoid arrest, but emerged after 1945 to help form the German Salaried Employees' Union (DAG) which was established April, 1949. In 2001 the DAG merged with four unions of the Confederation of German Trade Unions (DGB) to form Vereinte Dienstleistungsgewerkschaft, which is currently known as Ver.di.

Recognition 

Bechly was a recipient of the Order of the Crown (Prussia), 4th Class. In 1952, he was awarded the Grand Cross of the Order of Merit of the Federal Republic of Germany.

See also 
 List of trade unions in Germany

References

External links 
 Official website for Vereinte Dienstleistungsgewerkschaft (ver.di)
 

1871 births
1954 deaths
People from Neubrandenburg
People from Mecklenburg-Strelitz
German trade union leaders
Commanders Crosses of the Order of Merit of the Federal Republic of Germany